The Oakland Symphony Orchestra Association (OSOA) was a professional regional symphony orchestra in Oakland, California, from 1933 to 1986. In 1986 the symphony filed  Chapter 7 bankruptcy.  It is succeeded by the Oakland East Bay Symphony (OEBS).

History
The Oakland Symphony Orchestra was formed 1933 under the leadership of conductor Orley See; the orchestra presented four concerts in the lobby of the Oakland YMCA as its first season. See conducted until his death in 1957, at which time Piero Bellugi was appointed music director. In 1959 Bellugi was replaced by Gerhard Samuel.

During the 1960s the home of the orchestra was the Oakland Civic Auditorium (now the Kaiser Convention Center). During that same the Symphony season expanded from eight to twenty-four concerts, and the organization established a national reputation for innovative programming and community involvement.

In 1964 Samuel oversaw the creation of the Oakland Symphony Youth Orchestra, one of the Oakland Symphony's most successful ventures. Composed of seventy-five teenage players, it made five commercial recordings and toured internationally, winning the Silver Medal at the Herbert von Karajan Festival in Berlin. It performed in schools and for community organizations, and regularly commissioned and premiered works – projects it financed through volunteer activities. Samuel also supervised the formation of the Oakland Symphony Chorus, which grew to 120 voices and performed with other Bay Area orchestras, including the San Francisco Symphony.

In 1966 the Ford Foundation undertook a national program of matching grants to selected cultural institutions, with the aim of enabling them to achieve long-term financial stability through the building of a substantial endowment fund. The Oakland Symphony was one of sixty-one American orchestras selected, and received $1.35 million, the largest grant available to orchestras of its size.

In 1971 Harold Farberman replaced Samuel as music director. Under Farberman the annual subscription series grew from twenty-four to thirty-three concerts. The orchestra introduced its Pops Series and mounted a program of concerts directed at young people, with educational programs in schools. The Symphony also undertook free concerts in public places and campaigns to reach out to diverse ethnic populations. The latter included sponsoring the Minority Orchestral Fellowship Program, that offered young string players from nonwhite backgrounds the opportunity to play one year with a professional orchestra.

In 1972 the Association acquired and renovated the 2,998-seat Paramount Theatre (Oakland, California), with donations from by prominent businessmen Steven Bechtel Jr. and Edgar Kaiser Sr, who also served as board president. The 1973 restoration project was a critical success, receiving an award in 1981 from the National Trust for Historic Preservation in recognition of the accomplishment. An art deco masterpiece later declared a National Historic Landmark, the Paramount acted as a drawing card in itself. Following its opening, the Association sold nearly all its house on subscription, and sold out the majority of its individual concerts.  But even with the house full, the Paramount proved a financial burden. In addition, the Association financed the renovation costs with a $1 million loan. In 1975, rather than continue absorbing the Paramount's operating losses, the Association transferred the theater to the City of Oakland for $1, in exchange for forty years' free rent. To pay off
the remaining renovation loan, the board converted its Ford Foundation grant funds earmarked for endowment into operating funds. Later it began to invade its Ford matching funds, a step repeated across the next decade until the endowment was exhausted.

When Farberman resigned at the end of the 1978–79 season, conductor Calvin Simmons was appointed to take his place. Simmons had already served as guest conductor with a number of the world's leading orchestras, and was the first recipient of the Leopold Stokowski Conducting Award. As an African American conductor his presence enhanced the orchestra's prestige among Oakland's minority population. Simmons also added to the orchestra's reputation nationally, as his career as guest conductor with other orchestras and opera companies was on a meteoric rise. His presence was surely a significant factor in the institution's increasingly successful pursuit of foundation, state, and national grant monies.

Simmons's death in 1982 left the organization with a leadership void at an extremely difficult point in its history. Debts were mounting, while attendance figures remained essentially stable. Leonard Slatkin conductor of the St. Louis Symphony, stepped in as artistic consultant for the year between Simmons's death and the appointment of his replacement Richard Buckley, who assumed leadership in 1983. Under Buckley the Symphony continued expanding its season offerings. The Symphony received favorable reviews, though its subscription sales stayed flat and single ticket sales were in decline.

In 1985–86 the musicians went on strike, leading to the cancellation of the season's October opening. The strike was not resolved until well into November. Its settlement included significant increases in orchestra services and player earnings.

At the same time, the board was undergoing a radical and controversial reorganization that alienated some long-time supporters and left board structure chaotic. In spring 1986, the Symphony announced expansion to its largest season ever, with services added to its existing programs at Moraga's Rheem Theater and Berkeley's Zellerbach Hall. It also announced its decision to shift its main subscription series to its former home, the Oakland Auditorium theater, now known as the Calvin Simmons Theatre.

A month after announcing that expansion, management cut that season almost in half, citing financial crisis. A season cutback of that magnitude required player concessions on the contract signed less than eight months earlier. But management and players were unable to reach a compromise: on August 8, players filed an Unfair Labor Practices complaint with the National Labor Relations Board; on August 21, management filed for reorganization under Chapter 11 of the Federal Bankruptcy Code. On Friday September 12, musicians’ representatives and the management/board negotiating team held their only meeting to negotiate the issues. With the musicians unwilling to accept management's position, representatives of the Association board voted to file for liquidation of the Oakland Symphony
Orchestra Association under Chapter 7 of the Federal Bankruptcy Code.

Despite the financial and management difficulties of its later years, the Oakland Symphony was for over half a century a significant cultural force in the state and the region. In its earlier years, critics applauded its adventurous programming; the quality of its musicianship received frequent acclaim. Its elementary school outreach-education program reached over 20,000 children annually in Alameda and Contra Costa Counties; many of those children came from minority and/or disadvantaged backgrounds. The Symphony was praised for its minority services, including its Festival of Black Music and its Minority Fellowship Program. The Oakland Symphony Youth Orchestra and the Symphony Chorus drew praise for the quality of their work and for the models they established for other institutions.

In 1988, the Oakland East Bay Symphony (OEBS) was founded when musicians from the former Oakland Symphony and the Oakland Symphony League (Oakland Symphony Guild) joined together to form a new orchestra. The Oakland Symphony Youth Orchestra and Oakland Symphony Chorus,  both auxiliary ensembles still exist to this day.

Music directors
 Orley See (1933–1958)
 Piero Bellugi (1958–1959)
 Gerhard Samuel (1959–1971)
 Harold Farberman (1971-1978)
 Calvin Simmons (1979-1982)
 Leonard Slatkin, interim (1982-1983)
 Richard Buckley (1983-1986)
Michael Morgan ( 1988- )

Awards
 1977 ASCAP Award for Adventurous Programming
 1978 ASCAP Award for Adventurous Programming
 1982 ASCAP Award for Adventurous Programming

References

External links
 https://www.oaklandsymphony.org
 https://www.oaklandsymphony.org/about-us/chorus/
 https://www.oaklandsymphony.org/community-education/oakland-symphony-youth-orchestra/
 1987 Study of the Bankruptcy of the Oakland Symphony Association

1933 establishments in California
1986 disestablishments in California
Musical groups from Oakland, California
History of Oakland, California
Culture of Oakland, California
Organizations based in Oakland, California
Symphony orchestras
Musical groups established in 1933
Musical groups disestablished in 1986
Disbanded American orchestras